Michie Tavern, located in Albemarle County, Virginia, is a Virginia Historic Landmark that was established in 1784 by Scotsman William Michie, though in Earlysville. The Tavern served as the social center of its community and provided travelers with food, drink and lodging. It remained in operation, in the Michie family, until 1910, when it came to be owned by the Commonwealth of Virginia. In 1927, the Tavern was purchased by Josephine Henderson, who had it moved seventeen miles from Earlysville to its present location, close to Monticello.

History
In 1746, Major John Henry sold land in northern Albemarle County to John Michie. His son, William Michie, inherited the property from his father and built a house. Many people came to his house looking for food and a place to sleep, so William obtained a license to operate an ordinary in 1784 and operated a tavern, inn, and restaurant. The property reverted to state ownership in 1910 when Sally Michie was unable to care for the business. She was the last Michie family member to own the property. Josephine Henderson bought the tavern in 1927, and had it dismantled and moved near Monticello. Part of her interest in the tavern was to have a place to display her large collection of antiques. It was used as an architectural office by Milton Gregg beginning in 1932.

Overview
Michie Tavern is now a collection of historic buildings that includes a museum and restaurant. It has the largest grouping of reassembled buildings in Albemarle County. Now located near Monticello, it has retained the atmosphere of an 18th-century inn, pub, and a set of stores: The General Store, Tavern Shop, The Artisan Shop, and The Metal Smith Shop.

Gallery

See also
 Buck Mountain
 Monticello
 Ash Lawn-Highland
 University of Virginia

References

External links

Michie Tavern, 683 Thomas Jefferson Parkway (moved from Buck Mountain Road), Charlottesville, Charlottesville, VA at the Historic American Buildings Survey (HABS)

Taverns in Virginia
Houses on the National Register of Historic Places in Virginia
Houses in Albemarle County, Virginia
Journey Through Hallowed Ground National Heritage Area
Drinking establishments on the National Register of Historic Places in Virginia
Historic American Buildings Survey in Virginia
Virginia Historic Landmarks
Museums in Albemarle County, Virginia
National Register of Historic Places in Albemarle County, Virginia